Frank Gallagher (March 2, 1943 – November 26, 2021) was an American former professional football player who played guard in the  National Football League for eight seasons for the Detroit Lions, the Atlanta Falcons and the Minnesota Vikings.  He was born in Chester, Pennsylvania and attended St. James High School for Boys in Chester.

Gallagher was also the Owner of the Bullpen Baseball Academy in Novi, Michigan.

References

1943 births
Living people
Sportspeople from Chester, Pennsylvania
Players of American football from Pennsylvania
American football offensive guards
North Carolina Tar Heels football players
Detroit Lions players
Atlanta Falcons players
Minnesota Vikings players
Philadelphia Bell players